Saidpur may refer to:


Bangladesh
 Saidpur, Bangladesh, a city in Bangladesh
 Saidpur Airport
 Saidpur Cantonment, a cantonment of the Bangladesh Army
 Saidpur Upazila, an Upazila of Nilphamari District

India

 Saidpur (Assembly constituency), a constituency of the Uttar Pradesh Legislative Assembly
 Saidpur (Lok Sabha constituency), a former constituency of the Uttar Pradesh Legislative Assembly

 Saidpur, Badaun, a town in Uttar Pradesh
 Saidpur, Ghazipur, a town in Uttar Pradesh
 Saidpur, Kapurthala, a village in Kapurthala district, Punjab, India

Pakistan
 Saidpur, Islamabad, a village in Islamabad, Pakistan
 Saidpur, Kotli, in Azad Kashmir, Pakistan
 Saidpur, Badin, a village in Sindh
 Saidpur, Tando Muhammad Khan, a village in Sindh